Yui Kamiji defeated Diede de Groot in the final, 7–5, 6–2 to win the women's singles wheelchair tennis title at the 2017 US Open. It was the first of six consecutive years where Kamiji and de Groot would meet in the final.

Jordanne Whiley was the reigning champion from when the event was last held in 2015, but did not participate this year due to pregnancy. The event was not held in 2016 due to a schedule conflict with the 2016 Summer Paralympics.

Seeds

Draw

Draw

External links 
 Draw

References 

Wheelchair Women's Singles
U.S. Open, 2017 Women's Singles